A stomacher is a decorated triangular panel that fills in the front opening of a woman's gown or bodice. The stomacher may be boned, as part of a stays, or may cover the triangular front of a corset. If simply decorative, the stomacher lies over the triangular front panel of the stays, being either stitched or pinned into place, or held in place by the lacings of the gown's bodice.

A stomacher may also be a piece or set of jewellery to ornament a stomacher or bodice.

Early stomachers

In the 15th and 16th centuries, men and women both wore decorative stomachers (often called placards or plackets) with open-fronted doublets and gowns. The form and style of these stomachers in combination with the headgear is often used to date paintings to a certain time period.

In 1603, Elizabeth Wriothesley, Countess of Southampton, who was pregnant, wrote to her husband in London asking him to buy her a stomacher, 'buy me a "stumiger" of scarlet, half a yard broad, and as long at least, lined with plush to keep my belly warm a days when I must ride'. In 1635, Henrietta Maria's tailors were paid for "putting in whalebone into all her Majesty's stomachers when her Majesty was with child".

Some 17th-century women's stomachers of the Northern Netherlands:

Later stomachers

Stomachers were in and out of fashion through the 17th and 18th centuries, varying in style and decoration, throughout Europe and North America.

From about 1740, most gowns and bodices were worn to reveal the stomacher, which covered the front of the torso from neckline to waist or even below the waist. The bodice's lacings would then criss-cross over the stomacher, and eventually the lacings became a series of decorative bows.

Stomachers were often embroidered, or covered in pearls and other jewels. They could be made of the same fabric as the dress or of a contrasting fabric. Depending on the period, their bottom point was at waist level, or lower; towards the end of the 18th Century they could be as deep as 10 inches below the waistline, making it impossible for the woman wearing them to sit.

Necklines also defined the length of a stomacher. There was a brief period during the court of Louis XVI, when the neckline and stomacher actually were below the breasts, which were covered by a transparent ruffle of fabric called a fichu.

See also
 Fashion from 1500–1550, 1550–1600, 1600–1650, 1650–1700, 1700–1750, and 1750–1795
 Dudou, a Chinese undershirt sometimes known as a "stomacher"

References

Arnold, Janet:  Queen Elizabeth's Wardrobe Unlock'd, W S Maney and Son Ltd, Leeds 1988. 
Arnold, Janet: Patterns of Fashion: the cut and construction of clothes for men and women 1560–1620, Macmillan 1985. Revised edition 1986.
Ashelford, Jane: The Art of Dress: Clothing and Society 1500–1914, Abrams, 1996. 
Baumgarten, Linda: What Clothes Reveal: The Language of Clothing in Colonial and Federal America, Yale University Press, 2002.  
Cunnington, C. Willett and Phillis Emily Cunnington: Handbook of English Costume in the Eighteenth Century. London: Faber, 1972.
Payne, Blanche: History of Costume from the Ancient Egyptians to the Twentieth Century, Harper & Row, 1965. No ISBN for this edition; ASIN B0006BMNFS
Ribeiro, Aileen: Dress in Eighteenth Century Europe 1715–1789, Yale University Press, 2002,

External links

18th Century Stomachers
Embroidered bodice (stomacher), ca. 1740, in the Staten Island Historical Society Online Collection Database

History of clothing (Western fashion)
18th-century fashion